All foreign nationals visiting Seychelles are granted visa free access. However, they are required to obtain a Visitor's Permit on arrival unless exempt. The Visitor's Permit is issued free of charge and is initially valid for up to three months but it can be extended for a fee for a period of up to three months with further extensions not exceeding total period of twelve months. They must be in a possession of a valid passport, return or onward ticket, proof of accommodation and sufficient funds.

Mutual visa exemptions
Seychelles signed mutual visa exemption agreements with the following countries. They are not required to obtain a Visitor's Permit for short stays as indicated by the agreement for each country:

 — Visa-waiver agreement allows for stays up to 90 days per 180-day period. The agreement was signed on 13 December 2011 and entered into force on 21 October 2016.
 — Visa-waiver agreement for stays up to 14 days was signed in 2012.
 — Visa-waiver agreement allows for stays up to 30 days. The agreement was signed on 26 June 2013 and is in force.
 — The government of the Republic of Seychelles has agreed to grant Macau SAR passport holders and travel card holders visa-free access to Seychelles for up to 30 days. The above arrangement took effect on February 23, 2007.
 — Allows all citizens of states that are contracting parties to the Schengen Agreement to stay without a visa for a maximum period of three months during a six months period following the date of first entry. The agreement was signed on 28 May 2009 and entered into force on 1 January 2010.
 — Visa-waiver agreement allows for stays up to 30 days. The agreement was signed on 2 September 2015 and entered into force on 14 December 2015.
 — Visa-waiver agreement allows for stays up to 90 days. The agreement was signed on 23 November 2014 and entered into force on 16 July 2015.
A visa exemption agreement with Yugoslavia from February 1987 still applies to citizens of successor states.

Kosovo
Entry and transit is refused to  nationals, even if not leaving the aircraft and proceeding by the same flight.

Statistics

Most visitors entering the Seychelles came from following countries:

See also 

Visa requirements for Seychellois citizens
Tourism in Seychelles

References 

Seychelles
Foreign relations of Seychelles